Gouécké  or Gouéké is a town and sub-prefecture in the Nzérékoré Prefecture in the Nzérékoré Region of Guinea.

Three people died and four fell ill from an ebola outbreak on February 14, 2021.

References

Sub-prefectures of the Nzérékoré Region